The women's 800 metres event at the 2015 Military World Games was held on 5 October at the KAFAC Sports Complex.

Records
Prior to this competition, the existing world and CISM record were as follows:

Schedule

Medalists

Results

Final

References

800
2015 in women's athletics